Ernest Loyal Hughes Jr. is a former starting American football center who played five seasons in the National Football League (NFL) with the San Francisco 49ers and New York Giants, where he than retired after a knee injury. He was first drafted by the 49ers in the third round of the 1978 NFL Draft. He played college football at the University of Notre Dame and attended .

Ernie's was born and raised in Boise, Idaho. His talent as a high school football player at Capital High School in Boise, Idaho led legendary college coach Ara Parseghian to recruit him to the University of Notre Dame, where he matriculated in 1974.

An All-American offensive lineman, his Notre Dame teams played in the Orange, Gator, and Cotton bowls. He was teammates of some of ND most well known athletes: Joe Montana, Ross Browner, Rudy Ruettiger, Ken MacAfee, Luther Bradley, Ken Dike, Mike Calhoun, Jeff Weston, Jay Case, Ted Horansky and Steve McDaniels. In 1978, his senior year, Notre Dame led by quarterback Joe Montana won the National Championship by defeating Texas and Heisman Trophy winner Earl Campbell 38-10 at the Cotton Bowl.

One of the best stories that came from the Cotton Bowl was Ernie dominating efforts against Outland Trophy winner, Brad Shearer.

" The Irish had lost an insipid game to Ole Miss early in the season and were ranked 5th before the Bowl Game. Texas had everything going for them. They were unbeaten, and only Oklahoma and Arkansas had put up even token resistance. They had the Tyler Rose, Earl Campbell who had won the Heisman Trophy. They supported him with Johnny “Lam” Jones, from Lampassas in the Hill Country near Austin, Johnny “Ham” Jones from Hamlin in the dry plains of West Texas, and AJ “Jam” Jones from Youngstown Ohio. Texas was also bringing Brad Shearer, the Outland Trophy winner, who had keyed the three shutouts the Horns defense had put up. Steve “Bam-Bam” McMichael was his sidekick. Shearer had much to say the week before the game. Irish Offensive Guard Ernie Hughes a quiet Idahoan from Boise, said little but his blood was boiling.

The Texas exes marched to the Cotton Bowl for something more akin to a coronation that a football game, but the Irish imposed a crown of thorns on Akers, Campbell, Lam, Ham and Jam and Hughes made Spam out of Shearer.

Poor Irish! All they had was Montana, Ferguson, Heavens, Ernie Hughes and Browner, Fry, Golic and Bradley. Early in the game, Browner announced his presence by deftly batting a Randy McEachern lateral to the Cotton Bowl turf and recovering it. The game was barely two minutes old but it was an ominous play.

There is a syndrome in college football that occurs occasionally and blends the thrill of victory with the agony of defeat. It is when a visiting team hears a home, or home-state, crowd raucous at the beginning. Then the sound becomes more muted, and eventually there is silence, when fans slump in their seat and their eyes grow moist. Little by little, you look up and see empty seats in what was a scalper’s paradise of a packed house. Then vast wedges of blue and white seat sections of the Cotton Bowl, without a pixel of burnt orange.

The Irish moved to a 24-3 lead and there was no joy for Texas.. It ended 38-10 and Fred Akers, and for that matter the Ernie Hughes-dominated Brad Shearer were never heard from again."

Three offensive linemen from the 1977 unit – guard Ernie Hughes, center Dave Huffman and tackle Tim Foley – would earn first-team All-America notice in their careers. 

After winning the National Championship, Hughes was drafted by the Forty Niners after graduating with a Bachelor's Degree in Business Administration. In all, he spent eight seasons in the NFL with San Francisco, Washington, and the New York Giants, where he played offensive center with quarterback Phil Simms and Hall of Fame linebacker Lawrence Taylor.

After retirement, Hughes went into Commercial Real Estate for 30 years and carried a desire to contribute to the community, whether it be his community of teammates on the playing field or the community of Pleasanton in which he lived.

His efforts in the 90s as the founder and co-chair of the Notre Dame Celebrity Golf Classic, which benefitted the Ara Parseghian Medical Research Foundation, helped raise over $150,000. While his 5 children were growing up in Pleasanton, " Hughes was visible within the city's youth sports programs as an assistant football, basketball, and softball coach. As a mentor for the DARE program, he enjoyed interacting with youth while encouraging them with the basics of his own philosophy to build a strong mind and a strong heart. "

External links
Just Sports Stats

Living people
1955 births
Players of American football from Idaho
American football centers
Notre Dame Fighting Irish football players
San Francisco 49ers players
New York Giants players
Sportspeople from Boise, Idaho